Diloba is a genus of moths of the family Noctuidae.  It is the only genus in subfamily Dilobinae.

Species
 Diloba caeruleocephala – figure of eight moth Linnaeus, 1758

References
 Diloba at Markku Savela's Lepidoptera and Some Other Life Forms
 Natural History Museum Lepidoptera genus database

Noctuidae
Moth genera
Taxa named by Jean Baptiste Boisduval